The following outline is provided as an overview of and topical guide to Kyrgyzstan:
Kyrgyzstan – sovereign country located in Central Asia.  Landlocked and mountainous, Kyrgyzstan is bordered by Kazakhstan to the north, Uzbekistan to the west, Tajikistan to the southwest, and China to the east.

General reference 

 Pronunciation:
 Common English country name:  Kyrgyzstan
 Official English country name:  The Kyrgyz Republic
 Adjectives: Kyrgyzstani, Kyrgyz, Kirgiz, Kirghiz
 Demonym(s):
 Etymology: Name of Kyrgyzstan
 ISO country codes:  KG, KGZ, 417
 ISO region codes:  See ISO 3166-2:KG
 Internet country code top-level domain:  .kg

Geography of Kyrgyzstan 

Geography of Kyrgyzstan
 Kyrgyzstan is: a landlocked country
 Location:
 Northern Hemisphere and Eastern Hemisphere
 Eurasia
 Asia
 Central Asia
 Time zone:  UTC+06
 Extreme points of Kyrgyzstan
 High:  Jengish Chokusu 
 Low:  Kara Darya 
 Land boundaries:  3,051 km
 653 mi (1,051 km)
 683 mi (1,099 km)
 540 mi (870 km)
 533 mi (858 km)
 Coastline:  none
 Population of Kyrgyzstan: 5,317,000  - 111th most populous country

 Area of Kyrgyzstan: 199,900 km2
 Atlas of Kyrgyzstan

Environment of Kyrgyzstan 

Environment of Kyrgyzstan
 Climate of Kyrgyzstan
 Environmental issues in Kyrgyzstan
 List of protected areas of Kyrgyzstan
 Wildlife of Kyrgyzstan
 Fauna of Kyrgyzstan
 Birds of Kyrgyzstan
 Mammals of Kyrgyzstan

Natural geographic features of Kyrgyzstan 

 Mountain ranges of Kyrgyzstan
 Rivers of Kyrgyzstan
 Valleys of Kyrgyzstan
 List of mountain passes in Kyrgyzstan
 World Heritage Sites in Kyrgyzstan: None

Regions of Kyrgyzstan 

Regions of Kyrgyzstan

Ecoregions of Kyrgyzstan 

List of ecoregions in Kyrgyzstan

Administrative division of Kyrgyzstan 

Administrative divisions of Kyrgyzstan
 Regions of Kyrgyzstan
 Districts of Kyrgyzstan

Regions of Kyrgyzstan 

Regions of Kyrgyzstan

Districts of Kyrgyzstan 

Districts of Kyrgyzstan

Municipalities of Kyrgyzstan 

 Capital of Kyrgyzstan: Bishkek
 Cities of Kyrgyzstan

Demography of Kyrgyzstan 

Demographics of Kyrgyzstan

Government and politics of Kyrgyzstan 

Politics of Kyrgyzstan
 Form of government:
 Capital of Kyrgyzstan: Bishkek
 Elections in Kyrgyzstan
 Political parties in Kyrgyzstan

Branches of the government of Kyrgyzstan 

Government of Kyrgyzstan

Executive branch of the government of Kyrgyzstan 
 Head of state: President of Kyrgyzstan,
 Head of government: Prime Minister of Kyrgyzstan,

Legislative branch of the government of Kyrgyzstan 

 Parliament of Kyrgyzstan (unicameral): Supreme Council

Judicial branch of the government of Kyrgyzstan 

Court system of Kyrgyzstan
 Supreme Court of Kyrgyzstan

Foreign relations of Kyrgyzstan 

Foreign relations of Kyrgyzstan
 Diplomatic missions in Kyrgyzstan
 Diplomatic missions of Kyrgyzstan
 Kyrgyzstan–Russia relations
 Kyrgyzstan–Tajikistan relations
 Kyrgyzstan–Uzbekistan relations

International organization membership of Kyrgyzstan 
The Kyrgyz Republic is a member of:

Asian Development Bank (ADB)
Collective Security Treaty Organization (CSTO)
Commonwealth of Independent States (CIS)
Economic Cooperation Organization (ECO)
Eurasian Economic Community (EAEC)
Euro-Atlantic Partnership Council (EAPC)
European Bank for Reconstruction and Development (EBRD)
Food and Agriculture Organization (FAO)
General Confederation of Trade Unions (GCTU)
International Atomic Energy Agency (IAEA)
International Bank for Reconstruction and Development (IBRD)
International Civil Aviation Organization (ICAO)
International Criminal Court (ICCt) (signatory)
International Criminal Police Organization (Interpol)
International Development Association (IDA)
International Federation of Red Cross and Red Crescent Societies (IFRCS)
International Finance Corporation (IFC)
International Fund for Agricultural Development (IFAD)
International Labour Organization (ILO)
International Monetary Fund (IMF)
International Olympic Committee (IOC)
International Organization for Migration (IOM)
International Organization for Standardization (ISO) (correspondent)
International Red Cross and Red Crescent Movement (ICRM)
International Telecommunication Union (ITU)
International Telecommunications Satellite Organization (ITSO)

Inter-Parliamentary Union (IPU)
Islamic Development Bank (IDB)
Multilateral Investment Guarantee Agency (MIGA)
Nonaligned Movement (NAM) (observer)
Organisation of Islamic Cooperation (OIC)
Organization for Security and Cooperation in Europe (OSCE)
Organisation for the Prohibition of Chemical Weapons (OPCW)
Partnership for Peace (PFP)
Permanent Court of Arbitration (PCA)
Shanghai Cooperation Organisation (SCO)
United Nations (UN)
United Nations Conference on Trade and Development (UNCTAD)
United Nations Educational, Scientific, and Cultural Organization (UNESCO)
United Nations Industrial Development Organization (UNIDO)
United Nations Mission in Liberia (UNMIL)
United Nations Mission in the Central African Republic and Chad (MINURCAT)
United Nations Mission in the Sudan (UNMIS)
Universal Postal Union (UPU)
World Customs Organization (WCO)
World Federation of Trade Unions (WFTU)
World Health Organization (WHO)
World Intellectual Property Organization (WIPO)
World Meteorological Organization (WMO)
World Tourism Organization (UNWTO)
World Trade Organization (WTO)

Law and order in Kyrgyzstan 

Law of Kyrgyzstan

 Law Enforcement in Kyrgyzstan

 Constitution of Kyrgyzstan
 Human rights in Kyrgyzstan
 LGBT rights in Kyrgyzstan
 Freedom of religion in Kyrgyzstan

Military of Kyrgyzstan 

Military of Kyrgyzstan
 Command
 Commander-in-chief: Sooronbay Jeenbekov
 Forces
 Army of Kyrgyzstan
 Air Force of Kyrgyzstan

History of Kyrgyzstan 

History of Kyrgyzstan

Culture of Kyrgyzstan 

Culture of Kyrgyzstan
 Cuisine of Kyrgyzstan
 Languages of Kyrgyzstan
 Media in Kyrgyzstan
 National symbols of Kyrgyzstan
 Coat of arms of Kyrgyzstan
 Flag of Kyrgyzstan
 National anthem of Kyrgyzstan
 People of Kyrgyzstan
 Prostitution in Kyrgyzstan
 Public holidays in Kyrgyzstan
 Religion in Kyrgyzstan
 Buddhism in Kyrgyzstan
 Christianity in Kyrgyzstan
 Hinduism in Kyrgyzstan
 Islam in Kyrgyzstan
 World Heritage Sites in Kyrgyzstan: None

Art of Kyrgyzstan 
 Cinema of Kyrgyzstan
 Music of Kyrgyzstan
 Television in Kyrgyzstan

Sports in Kyrgyzstan 

Sports in Kyrgyzstan
 Football in Kyrgyzstan

Economy and infrastructure of Kyrgyzstan 

Economy of Kyrgyzstan
 Economic rank, by nominal GDP (2007): 143rd (one hundred and forty third)
 Agriculture in Kyrgyzstan
 Banking in Kyrgyzstan
 National Bank of Kyrgyzstan
 Communications in Kyrgyzstan
 Internet in Kyrgyzstan
 Companies of Kyrgyzstan
Currency of Kyrgyzstan: Som
ISO 4217: KGS
 Energy in Kyrgyzstan
 Health care in Kyrgyzstan
 Tourism in Kyrgyzstan
 Transport in Kyrgyzstan
 Airports in Kyrgyzstan
 Rail transport in Kyrgyzstan

Education in Kyrgyzstan 

Education in Kyrgyzstan

Health in Kyrgyzstan 

Health in Kyrgyzstan

See also 

Kyrgyzstan
Index of Kyrgyzstan-related articles
List of international rankings
List of Kyrgyzstan-related topics
List of villages in Kyrgyzstan
Member state of the United Nations
Outline of Asia
Outline of geography

References

External links 
 Government
 President of Kyrgyzstan official site
 Government of Kyrgyzstan official site
 Parliament of Kyrgyzstan official site
 Laws of the Kyrgyz Republic
 General information
 Country Profile from BBC News
 Kyrgyzstan. The World Factbook. Central Intelligence Agency.
 Kyrgyzstan at UCB Libraries GovPubs
 
 Kyrgyz Publishing and Bibliography
 Key Development Forecasts for Kyrgyzstan from International Futures
 Cities in Kyrgyzstan
 Bishkek city of Kyrgyzstan
 Osh city of Kyrgyzstan
 Jalal-Abad city of Kyrgyzstan

Maps
 

Kyrgyzstan